Phyllidia carlsonhoffi is a species of sea slug, a dorid nudibranch, a shell-less marine gastropod mollusk in the family Phyllidiidae.

Description
Phyllidia carlsonhoffi has a black body with small rounded yellow tubercles and more or less regularly distributed large conical yellow tubercles in the center of white rings. The ventral surface is a pale cream color, with a median black line on the bottom of the foot sole. The oral tentacles are long and cylindrical.

Distribution 
This species has been found in western Pacific Ocean (Micronesia, Papua New Guinea and Fiji).

Habitat 
This nudibranch prefers shallow subtidal lagoons, on the reefs, and seaward slopes, at depths of 1–25 meters.

Bibliography 
 Gary R. McDonald, University of California Santa Cruz - Nudibranch Systematic Index
 Brunckhorst, D.J. (1993) The systematics and phylogeny of Phyllidiid Nudibranchs (Doridoidea). Records of the Australian Museum, Supplement 16: 1-107.

References 

 WoRMS
 Sea Slug Forum

External links 
 Nudipixel
 Underwaterkwaj

Phyllidiidae
Gastropods described in 1993